Gavialiceps bertelseni is an eel in the family Muraenesocidae (pike congers). It was described by Emma Stanislavovna Karmovskaya in 1993. It is a marine, deep water-dwelling eel which is known from the southwestern slope of Madagascar, in the western Indian Ocean.

The species epithet was given in memory of ichthyologist Erik Bertelsen.

Names 
In Hindi the word ''Gavialiceps'' is translated as gavial and Bertelseni is named in memory of Erik Bertelsen.

Description 
Color is dark-black. Dorsal and anal fin are dark in the caudal sections of the body.  The gill and mouth cavities are dark but does not show through the skin.

Distribution 
This species of eel is found in Western Indian Ocean in south-western Madagascar.

References

Muraenesocidae
Fish described in 1993